Intense Records Presents: Recorded Live, Vol. 5 is a live studio EP by Christian industrial duo Mortal. The album includes covers of U2's "One Tree Hill" and Amy Grant/Michael W. Smith's "Thy Word".

Track listing
 "Lift" 3:22
 "Tuesday Assassin" 5:33
 "One Tree Hill" 4:05
 "Rift" 4:21
 "Thy Word" (homage to Amy and Michael) 3:59
 "Cryptic" 5:42

Personnel
 Jyro Xhan
 Jerome Fontamillas - keyboards, sampling, background vocals
 Allen Aguirre - vocals
 Jeff Bellew - guitar, background vocals
 Jim Chaffin - drums, background vocals
 Bryan Gray - bass guitar, background vocals
 Eric Hannah - background vocals
 Jake Landrau - guitar
 Michael Stone - background vocals
 Justin Winokur - guitar, background vocals

References

1993 live albums
Mortal (band) albums